Oscar Pupo is a paralympic athlete from Cuba competing mainly in category B1 400m and 800m events.

Oscar was part of the Cuban Paralympic team that travelled to Barcelona for the 1992 Summer Paralympics there he won a silver medal in the B1 400m, behind a world record time set by Carlos Conceicao of Portugal and won a gold medal in the B1 800m.

References

Paralympic athletes of Cuba
Athletes (track and field) at the 1992 Summer Paralympics
Paralympic gold medalists for Cuba
Paralympic silver medalists for Cuba
Living people
Medalists at the 1992 Summer Paralympics
Year of birth missing (living people)
Paralympic medalists in athletics (track and field)
Cuban male middle-distance runners
Visually impaired middle-distance runners
Paralympic middle-distance runners